Belaturricula dissimilis is a species of sea snail, a marine gastropod mollusk in the family Borsoniidae.

Description

Distribution
This marine species occurs along the Philippines.

References

 Watson, RB. "Report on the Scaphopoda and Gastropoda, collected by HMS Challenger. Challenger-Report." Zoology 15 (1886).
  Bouchet P., Kantor Yu.I., Sysoev A. & Puillandre N. (2011) A new operational classification of the Conoidea. Journal of Molluscan Studies 77: 273–308.

External links

dissimilis
Gastropods described in 1886